Tukreswari Temple (also known as Tukreswari Devalaya) in Goalpara district, Assam is an ancient Hindu temple and is dedicated to Sati as Shakti Peetha. Shakti Peethas are shrines or divine places of Sati, believed to have enshrined with the presence of Shakti due to the falling of body parts of the corpse of Sati. It is believed that an enraged Shiva performed the Tandava dance with Sati's charred body, which led her body came apart and the pieces fell at different places on earth. As per religious faith a portion of Goddess Sati's body part fell in this place and therefore this temple is known as Tukreswari (Tukreswari is derived from the Assamese word Tukura which means fragment or piece).

References

Hindu temples in Assam
Tourist attractions in Assam